Rebecca Watson is an American atheist blogger. She is the founder of the blog Skepchick and former co-host of The Skeptics' Guide to the Universe podcast. She also previously co-hosted the Little Atoms podcast.

Early life and education
Born in 1980, Rebecca Watson grew up in New Jersey. 
She graduated from Boston University in 2002, where she majored in communications.
Watson says she had little interest in science until she began working 
as a magician while at university and meeting other skeptics including magician James Randi.

Career
Watson blogs about atheism and feminist politics, and has been particularly active in critiquing the modern atheist movement (sometimes called "New Atheism") from within, especially regarding the lack of attention given to the role of women in the movement. Primarily active online, she was described by BuzzFeed as "the first major atheist whose rise has occurred on the web".

Skepchick
Inspired after attending the James Randi's The Amaz!ng Meeting, Watson founded the blog Skepchick in 2005, describing it as "an organization dedicated to promoting skepticism and critical thinking among women around the world". The same year, Watson released The Skepchick Calendar, a pin-up calendar featuring pictures of skeptical  women for every month. Proceeds provided the attendance fee for several female applicants to attend The Amaz!ng Meeting.

Originally the site consisted of a forum and a monthly online magazine, Skepchick Magazine, which was launched in January 2006. In February 2006, Watson created a blog titled Memoirs of a Skepchick, as an addition to the magazine. Eventually the blog, now simply titled Skepchick, became the main site, as Skepchick Magazine was discontinued in July 2006.
Skepchick has a focus on science and skepticism in general rather than atheism in particular. , the site, whose stated goal is "to discuss women's issues from a skeptical standpoint", hosts over 20 bloggers from around the world.

In 2010, Skepchick partnered with the Women Thinking Free Foundation to host a vaccination drive with the help of the "Hug Me!" campaign at the Dragon*Con convention in Atlanta, Georgia. Public health staff allowed members of the public to receive a TDAP vaccination free of charge, as well as educational literature promoting immunization. In 2011, Skepchick, the James Randi Educational Foundation (JREF), and the Women Thinking Free Foundation partnered to offer a similar vaccination clinic at The Amaz!ng Meeting 9 in Las Vegas, Nevada.
The site was the 2012 winner of The Ockham Awards for Best Skeptic Blog.

The Skeptics' Guide to the Universe
Watson co-hosted the Skeptics' Guide to the Universe podcast for nine years. Her first appearance was on episode 33 (March 9, 2006), where she was interviewed about her work on Skepchick. She returned on episode 36 (March 29, 2006) as a regular member of the panel. On December 27, 2014, she announced that she had recorded her final show prior to leaving the organization.

Public Radio Talent Quest
In May 2007, Watson entered the Public Radio Talent Quest, a contest aimed to find new public radio hosts. The contest reported receiving more than 1,400 entries. Watson's entries won the popular vote in every round, and she was declared one of three winners who each would receive $10,000 to produce a public radio pilot.

Watson's pilot, Curiosity, Aroused, was an hour-long program focused on science and skepticism. It featured interviews with Richard Saunders of Australian Skeptics and Mystery Investigators, and Richard Wiseman, author of Quirkology and Professor of the Public Understanding of Psychology at the University of Hertfordshire. She also investigated claims of poisonous amounts of lead in lipstick, went on a ghost tour in Boston and visited a Psychic Fair.

Her show was the only one among the three winners not to receive funding by the Corporation for Public Broadcasting for being turned into a one-year show.

"Elevatorgate"

The controversy that came to be known as "Elevatorgate" originated with a video Watson made following the June 2011 World Atheist Convention in Dublin, Ireland, where she appeared on a panel about sexism within the atheist community. In the video, Watson described speaking at the convention about her experience of being sexualized as a woman within the movement, and said that a man from a group of conference attendees had later followed her from the hotel bar into an elevator and sexually propositioned her as she was returning to her room early in the morning. She advised her viewers, "Just a word to the wise here, guys, don't do that", and went on to say: 

Reactions to the video varied, with some supporting Watson's desire for privacy and others criticizing Watson for overreacting. Writer and biologist PZ Myers supported Watson with a post about the incident on his blog Pharyngula. A negative response by the online atheist community to Watson's account of the elevator incident, which was a brief part of a longer video about other topics, soon spread across several websites, including Reddit, and became highly polarized and heated. The debate steadily grew to include the overall status of women within the secular movement, with most of the movements's prominent figures offering their opinion on whether the elevator incident was sexual harassment. The discussion spurred a continued backlash, with commenters online labeling women who spoke up on the subject as "feminazis" and other misogynistic slurs. Watson experienced death threats, with commenters on her blog saying in graphic terms how she should be raped and murdered and one man publishing a website threatening to kill her.

The controversy attracted mainstream media attention when biologist Richard Dawkins joined the debate. Although Watson had not compared the incident to sexism within Islam, Dawkins used the occasion to satirize the supposed indifference of Western feminists to the plight of oppressed Muslim women. In the comments section of Myers's blog, he wrote:

Dawkins' comments led to accusations of misogyny and Islamophobia. He explained that, in his view, Watson had not suffered any injury, comparing Watson's experience with the annoyance one might feel while riding an elevator with someone chewing gum.

Several commentators argued that the incident showed Dawkins' insensitivity to gender-related issues such as sexual violence. Religious scholar Stephen LeDrew writes that "For the first time since the New Atheism had risen to prominence, [Dawkins] found himself under attack by many of those who had viewed him as a respected leader". David Allen Green criticized Dawkins for dismissing lesser wrongs because bigger wrongs exist. Steven Tomlins and Lori G. Beaman argue that the incident highlights a schism within atheism over the role of feminism, some saying it should take a prominent place in the movement and others calling it divisive.

Watson said of Dawkins, "to have my concernsand more so the concerns of other women who have survived rape and sexual assaultdismissed thanks to a rich white man comparing them to the plight of women who have been mutilated, is insulting to all of us". She stated that she would no longer buy or endorse his books and lectures, writing:

The result of this exchange led to an extended internet flame war that several reports dubbed "Elevatorgate" and which has been the subject of Internet memes. In the wake of this and an incident at a Center for Inquiry-sponsored event, where female atheists reported gender bias and inappropriate behavior, organizations including the Richard Dawkins Foundation have reviewed their policies regarding sexual harassment and non-discrimination. Dawkins later apologized, stating, "There should be no rivalry in victimhood, and I'm sorry I once said something similar to American women complaining of harassment, inviting them to contemplate the suffering of Muslim women by comparison". Watson tweeted in response, "Richard Dawkins just did the blog-equivalent of coughing into his hand while mumbling 'sorry' to me. Eh, I'll take it."

Personal life
Watson married Sid Rodrigues in a surprise ceremony during The Amaz!ng Meeting in July 2009. In April 2011, she announced that she and Rodrigues were separated and seeking a divorce.

Honors
An outer main-belt asteroid discovered by David H. Healy on March 22, 2001 was named 153289 Rebeccawatson in her honor.

See also
 Greta Christina, atheist blogger

References

External links

 Skepchick
 Teen Skepchick 
 Rebecca Watson's PRTQ page with streaming of all her entries and Curiosity, Aroused pilot

Living people
American bloggers
American feminists
American women podcasters
American podcasters
American skeptics
Feminist bloggers
American atheist writers
Boston University College of Communication alumni
Place of birth missing (living people)
Writers from New Jersey
Victims of cyberbullying
1980 births
21st-century American women